Volker Strassen (born April 29, 1936) is a German mathematician, a professor emeritus in the department of mathematics and statistics at the University of Konstanz.

For important contributions to the analysis of algorithms he has received many awards, including the Cantor medal, the Konrad Zuse Medal, the Paris Kanellakis Award for work on randomized primality testing, the Knuth Prize for "seminal and influential contributions to the design and analysis of efficient algorithms."

Biography

Strassen was born on April 29, 1936, in Düsseldorf-Gerresheim.
He then took a position in the department of statistics at the University of California, Berkeley while performing his habilitation at the University of Erlangen-Nuremberg, where Jacobs had since moved. In 1968, Strassen moved to the Institute of Applied Mathematics at the University of Zurich, where he remained for twenty years before moving to the University of Konstanz in 1988. He retired in 1998.

Research
Strassen began his researches as a probabilist; his 1964 paper An Invariance Principle for the Law of the Iterated Logarithm defined a functional form of the law of the iterated logarithm, showing a form of scale invariance in random walks. This result, now known as Strassen's invariance principle or as Strassen's law of the iterated logarithm, has been highly cited and led to a 1966 presentation at the International Congress of Mathematicians.

In 1969, Strassen shifted his research efforts towards the analysis of algorithms with a paper on Gaussian elimination, introducing Strassen's algorithm, the first algorithm for performing matrix multiplication faster than the O(n3) time bound that would result from a naive algorithm.  In the same paper he also presented an asymptotically fast algorithm to perform matrix inversion, based on the fast matrix multiplication algorithm. This result was an important theoretical breakthrough, leading to much additional research on fast matrix multiplication, and despite later theoretical improvements it remains a practical method for multiplication of dense matrices of moderate to large sizes. In 1971 Strassen published another paper together with Arnold Schönhage on asymptotically fast integer multiplication based on the fast Fourier transform; see the Schönhage–Strassen algorithm. Strassen is also known for his 1977 work with Robert M. Solovay on the Solovay–Strassen primality test, the first method to show that testing whether a number is prime can be performed in randomized polynomial time and one of the first results to show the power of randomized algorithms more generally.

Awards and honors
In 1999 Strassen was awarded the Cantor medal, and in 2003 he was co-recipient of the Paris Kanellakis Award with Robert Solovay, Gary Miller, and Michael Rabin for their work on randomized primality testing. In 2008 he was awarded the Knuth Prize for "seminal and influential contributions to the design and analysis of efficient algorithms." In 2011 he won the Konrad Zuse Medal of the Gesellschaft für Informatik. In 2012 he became a fellow of the American Mathematical Society.

References

External links
 Home page of Dr. Volker Strassen
  Formulas for fast(er) matrix multiplication and inversion.
 

1936 births
Living people
20th-century German mathematicians
21st-century German mathematicians
Theoretical computer scientists
Linear algebraists
University of Göttingen alumni
University of California, Berkeley faculty
Academic staff of the University of Zurich
Academic staff of the University of Konstanz
Knuth Prize laureates
Fellows of the American Mathematical Society